The Oregon slender salamander (Batrachoseps wrighti) is a species of salamander in the family Plethodontidae from the Northwestern United States.

Distribution
The Oregon slender salamander is endemic to north-central Oregon, found particularly on the western slopes of the Cascade Range but also in some sites on the eastern slopes.

Conservation
The Oregon slender salamander is threatened by habitat loss and classified as IUCN Red List Near threatened.
It is federally listed as a Species of Concern. The state of Oregon has listed it as sensitive in the Oregon Conservation Strategy.

Habitat
They are typically found in old growth habitat, associated with late-successional Douglas fir forests. However they have been found in earlier succession forest with larger logs and much downed woody debris. They are found in large diameter decayed logs. They prefer habitats that have a closed canopy. The species has also been found in a suburban landscape.

Description
They have four toes on the hind feet.

Clutch size is 3–11 and the eggs are 4 mm in diameter.

Behaviour
When found this species will coil its body up and remain motionless.

References

Batrachoseps
Salamander
Fauna of the Northwestern United States
Endemic fauna of Oregon
Taxonomy articles created by Polbot
Amphibians described in 1937